Mama Said Knock You Out is the fourth studio album by American rapper LL Cool J. It was produced mostly by Marley Marl and recorded at his "House of Hits" home studio in Chestnut Ridge and at Chung King House of Metal in New York City. After the disappointing reception of LL Cool's 1989 album Walking with a Panther, Mama Said Knock You Out was released by Def Jam Recordings on September 14, 1990 to commercial and critical success.

Release and reception

Mama Said Knock You Out was released on September 14, 1990, by Def Jam Recordings. It was promoted with five singles, four of which became hits: "The Boomin' System", "Around the Way Girl", the title track, and "6 Minutes of Pleasure". The album was certified double platinum in the United States, having shipped two million copies. According to Yahoo! Music's Frank Meyer, Mama Said Knock You Out "seemed to set the world on fire in 1990", helped by its hit title track and LL Cool J's "sweaty performance" on MTV Unplugged. The title song reached number 17 on the Billboard Hot 100 and was certified gold by the RIAA. LL Cool J won Best Rap Solo Performance at the Grammy Awards of 1991.

In The New York Times, Jon Pareles wrote that Mama Said Knock You Out reestablished LL Cool J as "the most articulate of the homeboys", sounding "tougher and funnier" rapping about "crass materialism" and "simple pleasures". In Mark Cooper's review for Q, he wrote, "This 22-year-old veteran has lost neither his eye for everyday detail nor his sheer relish for words." Select magazine's Richard Cook said, "LL's stack of samples add the icing to a cake that is all dark, remorseless rhythm, a lo-fi drum beat shadowed by a crude bass rumble. It could be Jamaican dub they're making here, if it weren't for LL's slipper lip." Mama Said Knock You Out was voted the ninth best record of 1990 in the Pazz & Jop, an annual poll of American critics published by The Village Voice. Poll creator Robert Christgau later named it among his 10 best albums from the 1990s.

The album was included in Hip Hop Connection "Phat Forty", a rundown of rap's greatest albums: "The LP's title track proved to be the single of the year and probably LL's best record since 'I'm Bad', while 'Eat 'Em Up L Chill' and 'To Da Break Of Dawn' was [sic] the sound of Cool J getting his own back – and in style." In 1998, it was listed in The Source's 100 Best Rap Albums. In 2005, comedian Chris Rock listed it as the sixth greatest hip-hop album ever in a guest article for Rolling Stone. In 2020, Rolling Stone ranked the album at No. 246 on their updated list of the 500 Greatest Albums of All Time. The hip hop duo Run the Jewels took their name from a lyric on the album's sixth track, "Cheesy Rat Blues".

Track listing
All tracks written by James Todd Smith and Marlon Williams except otherwise noted.

Notes: The single version of the track "Jingling Baby (Remixed but Still Jingling)" was remixed by Marley Marl. "The Boomin' System" is censored on all editions of the album. The 12" single has the uncensored version.

Personnel 
Credits are adapted from AllMusic.

 James Baynard – trumpet  
 Flex – background vocals
 David Kennedy – engineer 
 Darren Lighty – background vocals, keyboards, programming 
 LL Cool J – producer, vocals
 Marley Marl – engineer, producer  
 Eric Williams – background vocals

Charts

Weekly charts

Year-end charts

Certifications

References

External links 
 

1990 albums
LL Cool J albums
Def Jam Recordings albums
Hardcore hip hop albums
Albums produced by Marley Marl
Albums recorded at Chung King Studios